The Käthe Kollwitz Museum is a museum in Berlin that owns one of the largest collections of works by the German artist Käthe Kollwitz (1867–1945), who lived and worked in Berlin's Prenzlauer Berg for over 50 years.

The museum opened in 1986, and traces its origins to the art collector Hans Pels-Leusden (d.1993). Pels-Leusden had been collecting the artist's works since 1950, and created his first Kollwitz exhibition in 1965.  He endowed 95 printed graphics, 40 drawings and 10 original posters to the museum.

The museum now owns over 200 works, including prints, drawings, posters, sculptures and woodcuts.  Highlights include the lithograph Brot! (1924), the self-portraits, the woodcut cycle Krieg (1922/23), works on the theme of death, and a woodcut in remembrance of Karl Liebknecht (1919/1920).  The upper floor contains a 2.1-metre-high sculpture of Kollwitz by Gustav Seitz.  

There are special exhibitions roughly twice a year.

The museum was located on Fasanenstraße since 2022, in a villa from 1871 featuring late-classicist modifications from 1897.  The building was partly destroyed during the Second World War, and not fully restored until the 1980s.  It now forms part of the so-called Wintergartenensemble, together with the nearby Literaturhaus Berlin (including the Café Wintergarten) and the Villa Grisebach.

See also
 List of single-artist museums

References

External links
Home page in English

Art museums and galleries in Berlin
Kollwitz
Art museums established in 1986
1986 establishments in West Germany
Kollwitz
Käthe Kollwitz